Dame Marion Audrey Roe DBE (born 15 July 1936 in London) is a Conservative Party politician in the United Kingdom, and former MP.

Early life and career
She went to the independent Bromley High School for Girls in Bickley, then the independent Croydon High School. She studied at the English School of Languages in Vevey in Switzerland.

Roe served on the Greater London Council.

Parliamentary career
She unsuccessfully contested the Barking constituency at the 1979 general election, achieving a 14% swing. Roe became Member of Parliament for Broxbourne from 1983 until 2005. She was a junior environment minister in the 1980s and chaired select committees in the 1990s. A eurosceptic, she was on the council of the right-wing Conservative Way Forward group.

She stepped down at the 2005 general election.

Later life 
Following her retirement, Roe established the Dame Marion Roe Young Citizen of the Year award, part of the annual Broxbourne Youth Awards celebrating the achievements of young people from the borough of Broxbourne.

In 2010 she became chair of the trustees of the National Benevolent Fund for the Aged, after the death of Winston Churchill (grandson of the former prime minister).

She was interviewed in 2013 as part of The History of Parliament's oral history project.

Personal life
She married James Kenneth Roe in 1958. They have a son and two daughters - one of whom, Philippa Roe, Baroness Couttie, was the Leader of Westminster City Council and was a member of the House of Lords as a Conservative from 2016 until her death in 2022.

References

External links
 They Work For You
 Ask Aristotle

1936 births
Living people
Conservative Party (UK) MPs for English constituencies
Dames Commander of the Order of the British Empire
Members of the Greater London Council
Female members of the Parliament of the United Kingdom for English constituencies
UK MPs 1983–1987
UK MPs 1987–1992
UK MPs 1992–1997
UK MPs 1997–2001
UK MPs 2001–2005
People educated at Bromley High School
People educated at Croydon High School
20th-century British women politicians
21st-century British women politicians
20th-century English women
20th-century English people
21st-century English women
21st-century English people
Women councillors in England